Nongbee Kiatyongyut (น้องบี เกียรติยงยุทธ) is a Thai Muay Thai fighter.

Biography and career
Nongbee started Muay Thai training at 10 years old at home, he joined the Kiatyongyut gym in Bangkok two years later. He won his first title at 17 years old, defeating Yodsaenchai Sityodtong for the Lumpinee Stadium 105 lbs belt. He also won the 118 lbs title in 1997 against Denthoranee Nakontongpakyu. In 2000 he captured the WMC World 126 lbs title.

Nongbee was a popular fighter of the 2000s reaching purses of 100,000 baht. Throughout his career he defeated notable champions such as Thongchai Tor.Silachai, Watcharachai Kaewsamrit, Phet-Ek Sitjaopho, Kem Sitsongpeenong, Attachai Fairtex, Anuwat Kaewsamrit, Bovy Sor Udomson or Saenchai Sor.Khamsing.

On July 18, 2011, Nongbee had an unexpected opportunity to fight for the Rajadamnern Stadium 135 lbs title after he transitioned to boxing months prior. He lost the fight by decision and retired from high level competition soon after. He kept fighting occasionally in the provinces.

Titles and accomplishments
World Muaythai Council 
 2000 WMC World Super Featherweight Champion
Lumpinee Stadium 
 1997 Lumpinee Stadium 105 lbs Champion
 1999 Lumpinee Stadium 118 lbs Champion

Fight record

|-  bgcolor="#cfc"
| 2018-12-01 || Win||align=left| Tarek Guermoudi ||  || France ||  || ||

|-  bgcolor="#cfc"
| 2015-12- || Win||align=left|  ||  || Ko Samui, Thailand || KO || ||

|-  bgcolor="#fbb"
| 2015-10-10 || Loss ||align=left| Adel Ekvall || West Coast battle 7 || Sweden || Decision || 5 || 3:00

|-  bgcolor="#cfc"
| 2015-04-11 || Win ||align=left| Gaetan Dambo || Extreme Fight For Heroes 3 || Draguinan, France || Decision || 5 || 3:00

|-  bgcolor="#cfc"
| 2013-04-12 || Win ||align=left| Chanaaik Saktawin ||  || Thailand || TKO || 3 ||

|-  style="background:#fbb;"
| 2011-07-18 || Loss ||align=left| Noppakrit Namplatrahoimook || Kiatyongyut, Rajadamnern Stadium || Bangkok, Thailand || Decision || 5 || 3:00
|-
! style=background:white colspan=9 |

|-  style="background:#c5d2ea;"
| 2011-05-19 || Draw ||align=left| Kriangkrai Tor.Silachai || Kiatyongyut, Rajadamnern Stadium || Bangkok, Thailand || Decision || 5 || 3:00

|-  style="background:#fbb;"
| 2011-04-09 || Loss ||align=left| Moses Tor.Sangtiennoi || Omnoi Stadium || Samut Sakhon, Thailand || Decision || 5 || 3:00

|-  style="background:#fbb;"
| 2010-04-24 || Loss ||align=left| Tukkatatong Phetpayatai || Omnoi Stadium || Samut Sakhon, Thailand || Decision || 5 || 3:00

|-  bgcolor="#fbb"
| 2010-02-27 || Loss||align=left| Saenchainoi Pumpanmuang || Omnoi Stadium - Isuzu Cup Semi Final || Samut Sakhon, Thailand || Decision || 5 || 3:00

|-  bgcolor="#cfc"
| 2010-01-02 || Win ||align=left| Sirimongkol Sakulratana || Omnoi Stadium - Isuzu Cup|| Samut Sakhon, Thailand || Decision || 5 || 3:00

|-  bgcolor="#cfc"
| 2009-11-21 || Win ||align=left| Chok EminentAir|| Omnoi Stadium - Isuzu Cup|| Samut Sakhon, Thailand || Decision || 5 || 3:00

|-  bgcolor="#cfc"
| 2009-10-24 || Win ||align=left| Petchmankong Phetfergus|| Omnoi Stadium - Isuzu Cup|| Samut Sakhon, Thailand || Decision || 5 || 3:00

|-  style="background:#fbb;"
| 2009-09-23 || Loss||align=left| Daoprakai Kwanmuang || Kiatyongyut, Rajadamnern Stadium || Bangkok, Thailand || Decision || 5 || 3:00

|-  bgcolor="#cfc"
| 2009-08-04 || Win ||align=left| Puja Sor.Suwanee || Eminent Air, Lumpinee Stadium || Bangkok, Thailand || Decision || 5 || 3:00

|-  style="background:#fbb;"
| 2009-06-15 || Loss||align=left| Daoprakai Kwanmuang || Petchaopraya, Rajadamnern Stadium || Bangkok, Thailand || Decision || 5 || 3:00

|-  style="background:#cfc;"
| 2009-05-21 || Win||align=left| Chok EminentAir || Kiatyongyut, Rajadamnern Stadium || Bangkok, Thailand || KO || 3 ||

|-  style="background:#fbb;"
| 2009-03-30 || Loss||align=left| Chok EminentAir || Kiatyongyut, Rajadamnern Stadium || Bangkok, Thailand || Decision || 5 || 3:00

|-  style="background:#cfc;"
| 2009-02-20 || Win||align=left| Petchasawin Seantransferry || Eminent Air, Lumpinee Stadium || Bangkok, Thailand || Decision || 5 || 3:00

|-  style="background:#fbb;"
| 2008-12-28 || Loss ||align=left| Sagetdao Petpayathai || Channel 7 Stadium || Bangkok, Thailand || KO (punch) || 3 ||

|-  style="background:#fbb;"
| 2008-10-16 || Loss||align=left| Petchasawin Seantransferry || Rajadamnern Stadium || Bangkok, Thailand || Decision || 5 || 3:00

|-  style="background:#fbb;"
| 2008-07-31 || Loss||align=left| Sagetdao Petpayathai || Daorung Chujaroen, Rajadamnern Stadium || Bangkok, Thailand || Decision || 5 || 3:00

|-  style="background:#c5d2ea;"
| 2008-07-01 || Draw||align=left| Sagetdao Petpayathai || Sangmorakot, Lumpinee Stadium || Bangkok, Thailand || Decision || 5 || 3:00

|-  style="background:#fbb;"
| 2008-05-22 || Loss ||align=left| Jaroenchai Kesagym|| Kiatyongyut, Rajadamnern Stadium || Bangkok, Thailand || Decision || 5 || 3:00

|-  bgcolor="#cfc"
| 2008-03-06 || Win ||align=left| Orono Muangseema || Kiatyongyut, Rajadamnern Stadium || Bangkok, Thailand || KO || 5 ||

|-  style="background:#fbb;"
| 2008-01-30 || Loss ||align=left| Saenchainoi Nongkeesuwit|| Kiatyongyut, Rajadamnern Stadium || Bangkok, Thailand || Decision || 5 || 3:00

|-  style="background:#cfc;"
| 2007-08-30  || Win ||align=left| Bovy Sor Udomson || Rajadamnern Stadium || Bangkok, Thailand || Decision || 5 || 3:00

|-  bgcolor="#cfc"
| 2007-07-19 || Win ||align=left| Orono Tawan || Kitayongyut, Rajadamnern Stadium || Bangkok, Thailand || Decision || 5 || 3:00

|-  bgcolor="#cfc"
| 2007-06-25 || Win ||align=left| Orono Muangseema || Onesongchai, Rajadamnern Stadium || Bangkok, Thailand || Decision || 5 || 3:00

|-  style="background:#fbb;"
| 2007-02-14 || Loss ||align=left| Lerdsila Chumpairtour || Sor.Sommai, Rajadamnern Stadium || Bangkok, Thailand || Decision || 5 || 3:00

|-  style="background:#fbb;"
| 2007-01-18 || Loss ||align=left| Jomthong Chuwattana || Kiatyongyut, Rajadamnern Stadium || Bangkok, Thailand || Decision || 5 || 3:00

|- style="background:#cfc;"
| 2006-12-28 || Win ||align=left| Puja Sor.Suwanee || Rajadamnern Stadium || Bangkok, Thailand || Decision || 5 || 3:00

|- style="background:#fbb;"
| 2006-10-19 || Loss ||align=left| Puja Sor.Suwanee || OneSongchai, Rajadamnern Stadium || Bangkok, Thailand || Decision || 5 || 3:00

|-  bgcolor="#cfc"
| 2006-08-31 || Win ||align=left| Saenchainoi NongkheeSuwit || Onesongchai, Rajadamnern Stadium || Bangkok, Thailand || Decision || 5 || 3:00

|-  bgcolor="#cfc"
| 2006-07-18 || Win ||align=left| Sarawut Lukbanyai || Phetsupaphan, Lumpinee Stadium || Bangkok, Thailand || Decision || 5 || 3:00

|-  bgcolor="#fbb"
| 2006-05-04 || Loss ||align=left| Kem Sitsongpeenong || Kiatyongyut, Rajadamnern Stadium || Bangkok, Thailand || Decision || 5 || 3:00

|-  bgcolor="#cfc"
| 2006-04-06 || Win ||align=left| Anuwat Kaewsamrit || Onesongchai, Rajadamnern Stadium || Bangkok, Thailand || TKO (Knees) || 4 ||

|-  bgcolor="#c5d2ea"
| 2006-03-06 || Draw ||align=left| Sarawut Lukbanyai || Onesongchai, Rajadamnern Stadium || Bangkok, Thailand || Decision || 5 || 3:00

|- style="background:#fbb;"
| 2005-12-22 || Loss ||align=left| Sarawut Lukbanyai || Rajadamnern Stadium Anniversary || Bangkok, Thailand || Decision || 5 || 3:00

|- style="background:#fbb;"
| 2005-11-16 || Loss ||align=left| Puja Sor.Suwanee || OneSongchai, Rajadamnern Stadium || Bangkok, Thailand || Decision || 5 || 3:00

|-  bgcolor="#cfc"
| 2005-09-22 || Win ||align=left| Isorasak Chor.Ratchadakon || Onesongchai, Rajadamnern Stadium || Bangkok, Thailand || Decision  || 5 || 3:00

|-  bgcolor="#CCFFCC"
| 2005-08-12 || Win ||align=left| Puja Sor.Suwanee || Queens Birthday Superfights, Sanam Luang || Bangkok, Thailand || Decision || 5 || 3:00

|-  bgcolor="#cfc"
| 2005-07-20 || Win ||align=left| Anuwat Kaewsamrit || Daorungchujarean, Rajadamnern Stadium || Bangkok, Thailand || Decision|| 5 || 3:00

|-  bgcolor="#cfc"
| 2005-06-22 || Win ||align=left| Isorasak Chor.Ratchadakon || Kiatsingnoi, Rajadamnern Stadium || Bangkok, Thailand || Decision  || 5 || 3:00

|-  style="background:#fbb;"
| 2005-03-17 || Loss ||align=left| Puja Sor.Suwanee || Onesongchai, Rajadamnern Stadium || Bangkok, Thailand || Decision || 5 || 3:00

|- style="background:#fbb;"
| 2005-02-12 || Loss ||align=left| Puja Sor.Suwanee || OneSongchai Tsunami Show, Rajamangala Stadium || Bangkok, Thailand || Decision || 5 || 3:00

|-  bgcolor="#cfc"
| 2004-12-29 || Win ||align=left| Kem Sitsongpeenong || Onesongchai, Rajadamnern Stadium || Bangkok, Thailand || Decision || 5 || 3:00

|-  style="background:#cfc;"
| 2004-10-25 || Win||align=left| Attachai Nor.Siripeung || Omnoi Stadium|| Samut Sakhon, Thailand || Decision|| 5 || 3:00

|-  style="background:#fbb;"
| 2004-09-17 || Loss ||align=left| Yodbuangam Lukbanyai || Rajadamnern Stadium || Bangkok, Thailand || Decision || 5 || 3:00

|-  style="background:#c5d2ea;"
| 2004-08-16 || Draw ||align=left| Puja Sor.Suwanee || Onesongchai, Rajadamnern Stadium || Bangkok, Thailand || Decision || 5 || 3:00

|-  style="background:#fbb;"
| 2004-05-05 || Loss ||align=left| Sagadpetch Sor.Sakulpan|| Rajadamnern Stadium || Bangkok, Thailand || Decision || 5 || 3:00

|-  style="background:#fbb;"
| 2004-03-04 || Loss ||align=left| Chalermpol Kiatsunanta || Onesongchai, Rajadamnern Stadium || Bangkok, Thailand || Decision || 5 || 3:00

|-  style="background:#fbb;"
| 2004-01-30 || Loss ||align=left| Chalermpol Kiatsunanta || Saengmorakot, Lumpinee Stadium || Bangkok, Thailand || Decision || 5 || 3:00

|-  style="background:#cfc;"
| 2003-11-26 || Win ||align=left| Sagadpetch Sor.Sakulpan || Rajadamnern Stadium || Bangkok, Thailand || Decision || 5 || 3:00

|-  style="background:#fbb;"
| 2003-10-10 || Loss ||align=left| Singdam Kiatmuu9 || Lumpinee Stadium || Bangkok, Thailand || Decision || 5 || 3:00

|-  bgcolor="#fbb"
| 2003-08-03 || Loss ||align=left| Isarasak Chor.Ratchadakon || Onesongchai + Kiatyongyut, Rajadamnern Stadium || Bangkok, Thailand || Decision  || 5 || 3:00

|-  bgcolor="#fbb"
| 2003-06-13 || Loss ||align=left| Orono Wor Petchpun || Petchpiya, Rajadamnern Stadium || Bangkok, Thailand || Decision  || 5 || 3:00

|- style="background:#fbb;"
| 2003-04-26 || Loss ||align=left| Kongpipop Petchyindee || OneSongchai || Chachoengsao Province, Thailand || Decision || 5 || 3:00

|- style="background:#fbb;"
| 2003-03-03 || Loss ||align=left| Saenchai Sor.Kingstar || OneSongchai, Rajadamnern Stadium || Bangkok, Thailand || Decision || 5 || 3:00

|-  style="background:#cfc;"
| 2002-10-09 || Win ||align=left| Mankong Kiatsamuan || Onesongchai, Rajadamnern Stadium || Bangkok, Thailand || Decision || 5 || 3:00

|-  style="background:#fbb;"
| 2002-09-09 || Loss ||align=left| Mankong Kiatsamuan || Onesongchai, Rajadamnern Stadium || Bangkok, Thailand || Decision || 5 || 3:00

|-  style="background:#cfc;"
| 2002-08-07 || Win ||align=left| Phet-Ek Sijaopho || Onesongchai, Rajadamnern Stadium || Bangkok, Thailand || Decision || 5 || 3:00

|- style="background:#fbb;"
| 2002-05-23 || Loss ||align=left| Samkor Chor.Rathchatasupak || Rajadamnern Stadium || Bangkok, Thailand || TKO || 5 ||

|- style="background:#fbb;"
| 2001-12-19 || Loss ||align=left| Saenchai Sor.Khamsing || Rajadamnern Stadium Anniversary || Bangkok, Thailand || Decision || 5 || 3:00

|- style="background:#fbb;"
| 2001-11-21 || Loss ||align=left| Saenchai Sor.Khamsing || Rajadamnern Stadium || Bangkok, Thailand || Decision || 5 || 3:00

|-  style="background:#cfc;"
| 2001-05-03 || Win ||align=left| Watcharachai Kaewsamrit || Rajadamnern Stadium || Bangkok, Thailand || Decision || 5 || 3:00

|- style="background:#fbb;"
| 2000-10-31 || Loss ||align=left| Ngatao Attarungroj || OneSongchai, Lumpinee Stadium || Bangkok, Thailand || Decision || 5 || 3:00

|- style="background:#fbb;"
| 2000-10-06 || Loss ||align=left| Ngatao Attarungroj || OneSongchai, Lumpinee Stadium || Bangkok, Thailand || Decision || 5 || 3:00

|- style="background:#;"
| 2000-07-18 ||  ||align=left| Kotchasarn Singklongksi || OneSongchai, Lumpinee Stadium || Bangkok, Thailand || ||  ||

|-  style="background:#cfc;"
| 2000- || Win ||align=left| Isonsak Jor.Rachadakon|| Rajadamnern Stadium || Bangkok, Thailand || Decision || 5 || 3:00
|-
! style=background:white colspan=9 |

|- style="background:#;"
| 2000-03-03 ||  ||align=left| Khunpinit Kiattawan || OneSongchai, Lumpinee Stadium || Bangkok, Thailand || ||  ||

|- style="background:#fbb;"
| 2000-02-11 || Loss ||align=left| Saenchai Sor.Khamsing || OneSongchai, Lumpinee Stadium || Bangkok, Thailand || Decision || 5 || 3:00

|-  style="background:#cfc;"
| 1999-2000 || Win ||align=left| Wanphichai Sor Khamsing || Lumpinee Stadium || Bangkok, Thailand || Decision || 5 || 3:00

|-  style="background:#cfc;"
| 1999-11-05 || Win ||align=left| Thongchai Tor.Silachai || Lumpinee Stadium || Bangkok, Thailand || Decision || 5 || 3:00

|-  style="background:#cfc;"
| 1999- || Win ||align=left| Denthoranee Nakontongpakyu || Lumpinee Stadium || Bangkok, Thailand || Decision || 5 || 3:00
|-
! style=background:white colspan=9 |

|-  style="background:#cfc;"
| 1999-07-25 || Win ||align=left| Saenkom Kiatpanu || Samrong Stadium || Thailand || Decision || 5 || 3:00

|-  style="background:#cfc;"
| 1999-06-20 || Win ||align=left| Rattanachai Wor.Wolapon || || Bangkok, Thailand || Decision || 5 || 3:00

|-  style="background:#;"
| 1998-09-28 || ||align=left| Yodradap Dawpaedriew || Lumpinee Stadium || Bangkok, Thailand || ||  ||

|-  style="background:#cfc;"
| 1998-03-27 || Win ||align=left| Sanchai Naratreekul || Rajadamnern Stadium || Bangkok, Thailand || Decision || 5 || 3:00

|-  bgcolor="#fbb"
| 1998-01-16 || Loss ||align=left| Pornsawan Porpramook || Rajadamnern Stadium || Bangkok, Thailand || Decision  || 5 || 3:00

|-  style="background:#cfc;"
| 1997- || Win ||align=left| Yodsaenchai Sityodtong || Lumpinee Stadium || Bangkok, Thailand || Decision || 5 || 3:00
|-
! style=background:white colspan=9 |
|-
| colspan=9 | Legend:

See also
List of male kickboxers

References

1981 births
Living people
Nongbee Kiatyongyut
Nongbee Kiatyongyut